These are the official results of the Women's Discus Throw event at the 1987 World Championships in Rome, Italy. There were a total number of 23 participating athletes, with the final held on Monday August 31, 1987.

Medalists

Schedule
All times are Central European Time (UTC+1)

Abbreviations
All results shown are in metres

Records

Qualification

Group A

Group B

Final

References
 Results

Discus throw
Discus throw at the World Athletics Championships
1987 in women's athletics